Central Avenue Historic District is a national historic district located at Lancaster in Erie County, New York. The district encompasses 17 contributing buildings in the central business district of the village of Lancaster.  The district includes a variety of residential, commercial, and government buildings built between about 1860 and 1940. It includes notable examples of Italianate and  Colonial Revival style architecture.  Notable buildings include the Lancaster Town Hall and Opera House (c. 1894, 1976-1978), Former Post Office (c. 1905), Cushing Block (c. 1896), and Potter-Eaton House (c. 1895, moved 1940).

It was listed on the National Register of Historic Places in 2014.

References

Historic districts on the National Register of Historic Places in New York (state)
Italianate architecture in New York (state)
Colonial Revival architecture in New York (state)
Historic districts in Erie County, New York
National Register of Historic Places in Erie County, New York